The 1994 Men's World Water Polo Championship was the seventh edition of the men's water polo tournament at the World Aquatics Championships, organised by the world governing body in aquatics, the FINA. The tournament was held from 1 to 11 September 1994, and was incorporated into the 1994 World Aquatics Championships in Rome, Italy.

Participating teams

Groups formed

Group A
 
 
 
 

Group B
 
 
 
 

Group C
 
 
 
 

Group D

Preliminary round

Group A

 September 2, 1994

 September 3, 1994

 September 4, 1994

Group B

 September 2, 1994

 September 3, 1994

 September 4, 1994

Group C

 September 2, 1994

 September 3, 1994

 September 4, 1994

Group D

 September 2, 1994

 September 3, 1994

 September 4, 1994

Second round

Group E

Preliminary round results apply.

 September 6, 1994

 September 7, 1994

Group F

Preliminary round results apply.

 September 6, 1994

 September 7, 1994

Group G

Preliminary round results apply.

 September 6, 1994

 September 7, 1994

Group H

Preliminary round results apply.

 September 6, 1994

 September 7, 1994

Final round

13th – 16th places (Group K)

Results of previous rounds apply.

 September 9, 1994

 September 10, 1994

9th – 12th places (Group J)

Results of previous rounds apply.

 September 9, 1994

 September 10, 1994

5th – 8th places (Group I)

Results of previous rounds apply.

 September 9, 1994

 September 10, 1994

Semi finals
September 10, 1994

Finals
September 11, 1994 —  Bronze Medal Match

September 11, 1994 —  Gold Medal Match

Final ranking

Medalists

Top goalscorers

References

External links
7th FINA World Championships 1994, Roma - Water polo Men's Tournament www.fina.org
 Results
 Men Water Polo VII World Championship 1994 Roma

1994
Men's tournament